Coplan Takes Risks (French: Coplan prend des risques) is a 1964 spy film directed by Maurice Labro and starring Dominique Paturel, Virna Lisi and Jacques Balutin. It was made as a co-production between Belgium, France and Italy, and was part of a boom in Eurospy films in the wake of James Bond's popularity

The film's sets were designed by the art director Jean Mandaroux.

Cast
 Dominique Paturel as Francis Coplan
 Virna Lisi as Ingrid Carlsen
 Jacques Balutin as Fondane
 Roger Dutoit as Bianco
 Jacques Monod as Le "vieux"
 André Valmy as Pelletier
 Yves Arcanel as 
 Marcel Charvey 
 Yvonne Clech as Madame Rochon
 Dominique Davray as Prostitute
 Eugene Deckers 
 Albert Dinan 	
 Tommy Duggan as Stratton
 Gisèle Grandpré	
 Guy Kerner as Rochon
 Henri Lambert as Scarpelli
 Margo Lion as Mme Slassinka
 Monique Morisi
 Alain Nobis	
 Anna Vallon 
 André Weber as Legay

References

Bibliography 
 Van Heuckelom. Polish Migrants in European Film 1918–2017. Springer, 2019.

External links 
 

1964 films
French spy films
Italian spy films
Belgian spy films
1960s spy films
1960s French-language films
Films directed by Maurice Labro
Gaumont Film Company films
1960s French films
1960s Italian films